Hoodless is a surname. Notable people with the surname include: 

Adelaide Hoodless (1858–1910), Canadian educational reformer
Elisabeth Hoodless (born 1941), British administrator, executive director of Community Service Volunteers